Zyuzicosa is a genus of spiders in the family Lycosidae. It was first described in 2010 by Logunov. , it contains 10 species.

Species
Zyuzicosa comprises the following species:
Zyuzicosa afghana (Roewer, 1960)
Zyuzicosa baisunica Logunov, 2010
Zyuzicosa fulviventris (Kroneberg, 1875)
Zyuzicosa gigantea Logunov, 2010
Zyuzicosa kopetdaghensis Logunov, 2012
Zyuzicosa laetabunda (Spassky, 1941)
Zyuzicosa nenjukovi (Spassky, 1952)
Zyuzicosa nessovi Logunov, 2012
Zyuzicosa turlanica Logunov, 2010
Zyuzicosa uzbekistanica Logunov, 2010

References

Lycosidae
Araneomorphae genera
Spiders of Asia